C90 or C-90 may refer to:

Science and technology
 Multiple myeloma and malignant plasma cell neoplasms (ICD-10 code)
 Caldwell 90 (NGC 2867), a planetary nebula in the constellation Carina
 C, the conventional electrical unit for the coulomb
 C90 audio cassette, a blank audio cassette in the very popular 90 (2 x 45) minute length

Computing
 Cray C90, a supercomputer
 C90 (C version), a standardized ISO C form of the C programming language, virtually the same as the ANSI C ("C89") standard

Transportation
 Beechcraft C90 King Air, an aircraft
 Continental C90, an aircraft engine
 Honda Super Cub, an underbone motorcycle designated C90 in a 90 cc version
 Chicago terminal radar approach control, (FAA designation C90); See Air traffic control

Other uses
 C90-CR (M3), a rocket launcher
 Ruy Lopez chess openings (ECO code)